This is a list of Danish television related events from 2008.

Events
4 January - Launch of the Danish version of The X Factor.
2 February - Simon Mathew is selected to represent Denmark at the 2008 Eurovision Song Contest with his song "All Night Long". He is selected to be the thirty-sixth Danish Eurovision entry during Dansk Melodi Grand Prix held at the Forum Horsens in Horsens.
28 March - 15-year-old Martin Hoberg Hedegaard wins the first season of X Factor.
24 October - Male dance duo Robotdrengene win the first season of Talent.
31 October - Olympic gold medal shot putter Joachim Olsen and his partner Marianne Eihilt win the fifth season of Vild med dans.

Debuts

4 January - X Factor (2008–present)
15 August - Talent (2008-2010)

Television shows

1990s
Hvem vil være millionær? (1999–present)

2000s
Klovn (2005-2009)
Vild med dans (2005–present)

See also
 2008 in Denmark